AFPS may refer to:

Military 
 American Forces Press Service, a defunct United States Department of Defense news service
Armed Forces Parliamentary Scheme, a British parliamentary scheme
Armed Forces Pension Scheme, the British Armed Forces pension provision

See also 

 APFS